Fontainebleau is a commune in the metropolitan area of Paris, France. Fontainebleau is a sub-prefecture of the Seine-et-Marne department, and it is the seat of the arrondissement of Fontainebleau. The commune has the largest land area in the Île-de-France region; it is the only one to cover a larger area than Paris itself. The commune is closest to Seine-et-Marne Prefecture, Melun.

Fontainebleau, together with the neighbouring commune of Avon and three other smaller communes, form an urban area of 36,724 inhabitants (2018). This urban area is a satellite of Paris.

Fontainebleau is renowned for the large and scenic forest of Fontainebleau, a favourite weekend getaway for Parisians, as well as for the historic Château de Fontainebleau, which once belonged to the kings of France. It is also the home of INSEAD, one of the world's most elite business schools.

Inhabitants of Fontainebleau are sometimes called Bellifontains.

History
Fontainebleau was recorded in the Latinised forms Fons Bleaudi, Fons Bliaudi, and Fons Blaadi in the 12th and 13th centuries, as Fontem blahaud in 1137, as Fontaine belle eau (folk etymology "fountain of beautiful water") in the 16th century, as Fontainebleau and Fontaine belle eau in 1630, and as the invented, fanciful Latin Fons Bellaqueus in the 17th century, which is the origin of the fanciful name Bellifontains of the inhabitants. Contrary to the folk etymology, the name comes from the medieval compound noun of fontaine, meaning spring (fountainhead) and fountain, and blitwald, consisting of the Germanic personal name Blit and the Germanic word for forest.

This hamlet was endowed with a royal hunting lodge and a chapel by Louis VII in the middle of the twelfth century. A century later, Louis IX, also called Saint Louis, who held Fontainebleau in high esteem and referred to it as "his wilderness", had a country house and a hospital constructed there.

Philip the Fair was born there in 1268 and died there in 1314. In all, thirty-four sovereigns, from Louis VI, the Fat, (1081–1137) to Napoleon III (1808–1873), spent time at Fontainebleau.

The connection between the town of Fontainebleau and the French monarchy was reinforced with the transformation of the royal country house into a true royal palace, the Palace of Fontainebleau. This was accomplished by the great builder-king, Francis I (1494–1547), who, in the largest of his many construction projects, reconstructed, expanded, and transformed the royal château at Fontainebleau into a residence that became his favourite, as well as the residence of his mistress, Anne, duchess of Étampes.

From the sixteenth to the eighteenth century, every monarch, from Francis I to Louis XV, made important renovations at the Palace of Fontainebleau, including demolitions, reconstructions, additions, and embellishments of various descriptions, all of which endowed it with a character that is a bit heterogeneous, but harmonious nonetheless.

On 18 October 1685, Louis XIV signed the Edict of Fontainebleau there. Also known as the Revocation of the Edict of Nantes, this royal fiat reversed the permission granted to the Huguenots in 1598 to worship publicly in specified locations and hold certain other privileges. The result was that a large number of Protestants were forced to convert to the Catholic faith, killed, or forced into exile, mainly in the Low Countries, Prussia and in England.

The 1762 Treaty of Fontainebleau, a secret agreement between France and Spain concerning the Louisiana territory in North America, was concluded here. Also, preliminary negotiations, held before the 1763 Treaty of Paris was signed, ending the Seven Years' War, were at Fontainebleau.

During the French Revolution, Fontainebleau was temporarily renamed Fontaine-la-Montagne, meaning "Fountain by the Mountain". (The mountain referred to is the series of rocky formations located in the forest of Fontainebleau.)

On 29 October 1807, Manuel Godoy, chancellor to the Spanish king, Charles IV and Napoleon signed the Treaty of Fontainebleau, which authorized the passage of French troops through Spanish territories so that they might invade Portugal.

On 20 June 1812, Pope Pius VII arrived at the château of Fontainebleau, after a secret transfer from Savona, accompanied by his personal physician, Balthazard Claraz. In poor health, the Pope was the prisoner of Napoleon, and he remained in his genteel prison at Fontainebleau for nineteen months. From June 1812 until 23 January 1814, the Pope never left his apartments.

On 20 April 1814, Napoleon Bonaparte, shortly before his first abdication, bid farewell to the Old Guard, the renowned grognards (gripers) who had served with him since his first campaigns, in the "White Horse Courtyard" (la cour du Cheval Blanc) at the Palace of Fontainebleau. (The courtyard has since been renamed the "Courtyard of Goodbyes".) According to contemporary sources, the occasion was very moving. The 1814 Treaty of Fontainebleau stripped Napoleon of his powers (but not his title as Emperor of the French) and sent him into exile on Elba.

Until the 19th century, Fontainebleau was a village and a suburb of Avon. Later, it developed as an independent residential city.

For the 1924 Summer Olympics, the town played host to the riding portion of the modern pentathlon event. This event took place near a golf course.

In July and August 1946, the town hosted the Franco-Vietnamese Conference, intended to find a solution to the long-contested struggle for Vietnam's independence from France, but the conference ended in failure.

Fontainebleau also hosted the general staff of the Allied Forces in Central Europe (Allied Forces Center or AFCENT) and the land forces command (LANDCENT); the air forces command (AIRCENT) was located nearby at Camp Guynemer. These facilities were in place from the inception of NATO until France's partial withdrawal from NATO in 1967 when the United States returned those bases to French control. NATO moved AFCENT to Brunssum in the Netherlands and AIRCENT to Ramstein in West Germany. (Note that the Supreme Headquarters Allied Powers Europe, also known as SHAPE, was located at Rocquencourt, west of Paris, quite a distance from Fontainebleau).

In 2008, the men's World Championship of Real Tennis (Jeu de Paume) was held in the tennis court of the Chateau. The real tennis World Championship is the oldest in sport and Fontainebleau has one of only two active courts in France.

Population

Tourism
Fontainebleau is a popular tourist destination; each year, 300,000 people visit the palace and more than 13 million people visit the forest.

Fontainebleau forest
The forest of Fontainebleau surrounds the town and dozens of nearby villages. It is protected by France's Office National des Forêts, and it is recognised as a French national park. It is managed in order that its wild plants and trees, such as the rare service tree of Fontainebleau, and its populations of birds, mammals, and butterflies, can be conserved. It is a former royal hunting park often visited by hikers and horse riders. The forest is also well regarded for bouldering and is particularly popular among climbers, as it is the biggest developed area of that kind in the world.

Royal Château de Fontainebleau
The Royal Château de Fontainebleau is a large palace where the kings of France took their ease. It is also the site where the French royal court, from 1528 onwards, entertained the body of new ideas that became known as the Renaissance.

INSEAD
The European (and historic) campus of the INSEAD business school is located at the edge of Fontainebleau, by the Lycee Francois Couperin. INSEAD students live in local accommodations around the Fontainebleau area, and especially in the surrounding towns.

Other notables
The graves of G. I. Gurdjieff and Katherine Mansfield can be found in the cemetery at Avon.

Transport
Fontainebleau is served by two stations on the Transilien Paris–Lyon rail line: Fontainebleau–Avon and Thomery. Fontainebleau–Avon station, the station closest to the centre of Fontainebleau, is located near the dividing-line between the commune of Fontainebleau and the commune of Avon, on the Avon side of the border.

Hospital
Fontainebleau has a campus of the Centre hospitalier Sud Seine et Marne.

Notable people
 Aga Khan IV, international business magnate
 Alfonso XIII, king of Spain, after his abdication
Arnold Bennett (1867- 1931), writer, lived in Fontainebleau from 1908 to 1912
 Rosa Bonheur, a 19th-century artist
 Gabrièle Buffet-Picabia (1881–1985), art critic, first wife of painter Francis Picabia was born in Fontainebleau
 Christina, Queen of Sweden; her lover, Gian Rinaldo Monaldeschi, was murdered in Fontainebleau
 Joseph Charles Hippolyte Crosse (1826–1898), conchologist, lived and died at Château d'Argeville,near Fontainebleau
 Ernst August, Prince of Hanover and Caroline, Princess of Hanover
 Lin Fengmian, Chinese painter who advocated the synthesis of Western techniques and Eastern traditions and later became known as the father of modern Chinese painting, brushed up on his French in Fontainebleau before moving on to study art at the Ecole Nationale Superieure des Beaux-Arts of Paris
 Francis I of France, built a large part of the palace
 Francis II of France, born in Fontainebleau
 Henry III of France, born in Fontainebleau
 Henry IV of France, built a part of the palace
 Anna Elizabeth Klumpke, an early twentieth-century artist
 Pierre Levassor (1808–1870), actor
 Pascal Lecocq, born in 1958, fine art painter, study at École Comairas (1973–1977) and exhibit for the 1st time in 1977 ;
 Louis XIII, king of France, born in Fontainebleau
 Louis XIV of France, built a part of the palace
 Louis XV, king of France, built a part of the palace
 Louis XVI and Marie Antoinette, king and queen of France, built a part of the palace
 Mark Maggiori, lead vocalist of Pleymo
 Katherine Mansfield (1888–1923), New Zealander short story writer, died in Fontainebleau
 Oscar Milosz, poet, novelist, dramatist and Lithuanian diplomat died in Fontainebleau in 1939.
 Louis Victoire Lux de Montmorin-Saint-Hérem (1762–1792), French military man
 Napoleon
 Napoleon III
 Pope Pius VII, lived (as a prisoner of Napoleon) in the palace
 Philip IV of France, born and died in Fontainebleau
 Django Reinhardt, died near Fontainebleau, in Samois-sur-Seine
 Robert Louis Stevenson, a Scottish novelist, poet, essayist, and travel writer
 Lilian Thuram, football player, World Cup and European Championship winner

Twinning
Fontainebleau is twinned with the following cities:
 Konstanz, Germany, since 28 May 1960
 Richmond-upon-Thames, England, United Kingdom, since 1977
 Siem Reap, Cambodia, since 11 June 2000
 Nanjing, China
 Lodi, Italy since 2011
 Sintra, Portugal since 2016

Image gallery

See also
 Communauté d'agglomération du Pays de Fontainebleau
 Fontainebleau rock climbing
 
 Milly-la-Forêt
 Treaty of Fontainebleau (1762)

Bibliography 
 The Works of Robert Louis Stevenson, Miscellanies, Volume III, Edinburgh, Longmans Green and Co, 1895 "Fontainebleau : Village Communities of Painters" p.201-226

References

External links

 

 
Venues of the 1924 Summer Olympics
Communes of Seine-et-Marne
Olympic modern pentathlon venues
Subprefectures in France